Stephanie Savides (born February 6, 1965) is an American former professional tennis player.

Savides was raised in Los Altos Hills, California and is of Greek descent. She played varsity tennis for Stanford University, earning All-American honors in singles and doubles. A three-time member of an NCAA championship winning team, she was also a NCAA doubles finalist in 1986.

On the professional tour, Savides reached a best singles world ranking of 263 and had a main draw appearance at the 1988 Australian Open, as a lucky loser from qualifying. She also featured at the 1988 French Open in the women's doubles and made a best doubles ranking of 174 in the world.

ITF finals

Singles: 1 (1–0)

Doubles: 3 (1–2)

References

External links
 
 

1965 births
Living people
American female tennis players
Stanford Cardinal women's tennis players
Tennis people from California
People from Los Altos Hills, California